Adakamaranahalli (Bangalore North)  is a village in the southern state of Karnataka, India. It is located in the Bangalore North taluk of Bangalore district in Karnataka.

See also
 Bangalore
 Districts of Karnataka

References

External links
 http://Bangalore.nic.in/

Villages in Bangalore Urban district